Batyle suturalis is a species of beetle in the family Cerambycidae. It was described by Thomas Say in 1824.

References

Trachyderini
Beetles described in 1824
Taxa named by Thomas Say